Illington is a village and former civil parish, now in the parish of Wretham in the Breckland district, in the county of Norfolk, England. The village is 6.2 miles north east of Thetford, 24 miles west south west of Norwich and 92.3 miles north east of London. The nearest railway station is at Thetford for the Breckland Line which runs between Cambridge and Norwich. The nearest airport is Norwich International Airport. In 1931 the parish had a population of 53. On 1 April 1935 the parish was abolished to form Wretham.

History
The villages name means 'farm/settlement of Illa's people' or perhaps, 'farm/settlement connected with Illa'.

Illington has an entry in the Domesday Book of 1085. In the great book Illington is recorded by the name ‘’Illinketune’’. The main landholder is William de Warenne

References

External links

Villages in Norfolk
Former civil parishes in Norfolk
Breckland District